River Rise Preserve State Park is a Florida state park, located six miles north of High Springs, off U.S. Route 441 within O'Leno State Park. The name derives from it being where the Santa Fe River comes to the surface after having traveled underground for some distance beneath O'Leno State Park.

References and external links
 River Rise Preserve State Park at Florida State Parks

State parks of Florida
Parks in Columbia County, Florida